Piratisca is a genus of moths of the family Noctuidae. The genus was erected by Edward Meyrick in 1902. Both species in this genus are known from New Guinea.

Species
Piratisca minax Meyrick, 1902
Piratisca rufotincta (Rothschild, 1915)

References

Herminiinae